Aminata Touré (born 15 November 1992) is a German politician of Alliance '90/The Greens, the German green party, mainly active in Schleswig-Holstein state politics. She was elected on 29 June 2017, at the age of 25, to the Landtag of Schleswig-Holstein and served as vice-president of the Landtag until 2022. Since 29 June 2022, she has been serving as Minister of Social Affairs, Youth, Family, Senior Citizens, Integration and Equality of the State of Schleswig-Holstein.

Early life and education 
Touré's parents fled to Germany from Mali following the 1991 Malian coup d'état.  She was born in Neumünster. Following her Abitur, she studied political science and French at the University of Kiel, earning her bachelor degree in 2016. She studied abroad for a semester in 2013–14 at the Complutense University of Madrid. From 2014 to 2017, she worked for the member of parliament Luise Amtsberg.

Career 
In 2012, Touré joined the Kiel Green Youth, and was elected as its speaker in 2013. In 2016, she was elected as an assessor in her state's green party, an office she held until her election to the Landtag in 2017.

Touré was a candidate for the Schleswig-Holstein Green Youth in the 2017 Schleswig-Holstein state election and was number 11 on the party's electoral list. She also simultaneously ran for the single-seat constituency of Neumünster. Touré did not enter the Landtag following the election, as the Green Party only received ten seats; Touré later filled the seat vacated by Monika Heinold, who was named Minister of Finance of Schleswig-Holstein. Within her state parliamentary faction, she is the speaker for Migration, Women & Equality, Children & Youth, LGBT Issues, and Anti-Racism.

Upon Rasmus Andresen's departure for the European Parliament in June 2019, his office as vice-president of the Landtag was vacant, and Touré was elected by the coalition to succeed him on 28 August 2019. She is the first Afro-German, as well as the youngest, Vice President of a Landtag.

In the negotiations to form a coalition government between the SPD, the Green Party and Free Democratic Party (FDP) following the 2021 federal elections, Touré was part of her party's delegation in the working group on equality, co-chaired by Petra Köpping, Ricarda Lang and Herbert Mertin. 

Touré was nominated by her party as delegate to the Federal Convention for the purpose of electing the President of Germany in 2022.

After the 2022 Schleswig-Holstein state election, Touré's party, Alliance '90/The Greens entered into a coalition with the CDU under Minister-President Daniel Günther (CDU). Touré has been appointed on 29 June 2022 as Minister of Social Affairs, Youth, Family, Senior Citizens, Integration and Equality in the Second Günther cabinet, replacing Heiner Garg (FDP).

Touré was featured on the cover of Vogue Germany in December 2022. She is the first minister or politician to appear on the cover of Vogue in Germany.

References

External links 

Living people
1992 births
Members of the Landtag of Schleswig-Holstein
Alliance 90/The Greens politicians
21st-century German politicians
21st-century German women politicians
University of Kiel alumni
German people of Malian descent
Politicians of African descent
Ministers of the Schleswig-Holstein State Government